Stanley Harding Mortensen (26 May 1921 – 22 May 1991) was an English professional footballer, most famous for his part in the 1953 FA Cup Final (subsequently known as the "Matthews Final"), in which he became the only player ever to score a hat-trick in a Wembley FA Cup Final. He was also both the first player to score for England in a FIFA World Cup qualifying campaign and the first England player to score in the tournament proper.

Wartime career
South Shields-born Mortensen went to war in 1939 as a teenage wireless operator and overcame an injury – sustained when his RAF bomber crashed, leaving him as the only survivor – to be signed by Blackpool in 1941. While stationed at RAF Lossiemouth in Scotland, he played several unofficial matches for Aberdeen, also turning out as a guest for Arsenal with an impressive scoring record (25 goals in 19 appearances).

During the war, he scored dozens of goals before making a strange piece of history by switching teams to play for Wales when they needed a reserve during a game against England on 25 September 1943. Wales' Ivor Powell was injured and had to leave the field and, as England's reserve, Mortensen took his place in the Welsh side. Wales lost 8–3, and Stanley Matthews later wrote of the game: "Nobody in the 80,000 crowd had any idea that Mortensen was going to change. When, a quarter of an hour later, the player in the red jersey returned to the field, a cheer went up from the crowd, who — not knowing the seriousness of Powell's injury — were under the impression the injured Welsh wing half was returning. Even when "Powell" went to inside-left, the onlookers did not suspect anything unusual, as team switches are often necessary after a player has been injured. Even some of the England players did not know that Mortensen was playing on the other side, and the football reporters, whose headquarters at Wembley are at the top of the main stand, did not know of the change until after half-time."

Post-war club career
In a playing career spent mostly with Blackpool, Mortensen scored 197 league goals in 317 games. His 197 goals for Blackpool all in the top flight, ranks him as the 33rd highest goalscorer in history. He is the second highest top scorer for Blackpool, behind Jimmy Hampson.

Mortensen holds the record of scoring in the most consecutive league matches with 15, another record he still holds today is that he scored in twelve consecutive rounds of the FA Cup, including the defeat in the 1948 FA Cup Final. In the 1947-48 season Blackpool beat Leeds United and Chester 4-0 then Colchester United 5-0 all at home. A 2-0 win at Fulham set up the semi-final clash with Tottenham Hotspur at Villa Park. Spurs were leading 1-0 with four minutes remaining when Mortensen equalised from a cross from Stanley Matthews. Mortensen scored two more goals in extra-time as Blackpool reached the final of the FA Cup for the first time. Mortensen had scored in every round so far, 7 goals in total. In the final, Blackpool took an early lead from a penalty against Manchester United before Jack Rowley equalised. Mortensen scored before half time to make it 2-1, becoming the first player in history to score in every round of the FA Cup in one season. However, Rowley in the second half again levelled before two goals in the last ten minutes secured a 4-2 win for Manchester United.

Blackpool were back at Wembley for the 1950-51 FA Cup final. The Tangerines overcame Charlton Athletic 3-0 in a home replay after a 2-2 draw away. Home wins over Stockport County 2-1, Mansfield Town 2-0 and Fulham 1-0, saw them face Birmingham City at Maine Road. A 0-0 draw meant a replay at Goodison Park where Blackpool won 2-1. Mortensen had scored 5 goals but couldn’t add to his tally as Blackpool suffered disappointment again. A second half brace from Jackie Milburn secured a 2-0 win for Newcastle United.

It would be third time lucky for Mortensen and Blackpool as they reached their third final in five years in the 1952-53 season. Mortensen would write himself into the record books, however the final is remembered and commonly referred to as the Matthews final. Blackpool beat Sheffield Wednesday away 2-1, Huddersfield Town 1-0 at home then disposed of Southampton after a replay. A 1-1 home draw was followed by 2-1 away success. A 2-1 away win at Arsenal set up another Villa Park semi-final against Tottenham. A 2-1 victory took them to their third Wembley final with Bolton Wanderers their opponents. Nat Lofthouse gave Bolton a second minute lead before a Mortensen shot was deflected in for the equaliser, but at half time Bolton were 2-1 up. Bolton went 3-1 up before Matthews set up Mortensen who made it 3-2. With two minutes remaining Mortensen scored a twenty yard free kick to bring the scores level at 3-3, becoming the first player to score a hat-trick in a FA Cup final at Wembley. In injury time Billy Perry converted a Matthews cross to seal a 4-3 win.

Mortensen’s famous hat-trick became a fact retrospectively, his first goal was widely considered an own goal by Harold Hassell at the time. Kenneth Wolstenholme, the BBC commentator, attributed the goal to Hassell, as did the Sunday papers the following morning. In the book The Great English Final, author David Tossell states that only since the publication of the FA Yearbook two months later, which awarded Mortensen with all three goals, that the hat-trick became accepted as fact. In the Charity Shield match at Highbury against Arsenal,  Mortensen put the FA Cup winners ahead. However, Tommy Lawton and a brace from Doug Lishman saw the league champions win 3-1.

The 1950-51 league season saw Mortensen break the record of scoring in the most consecutive matches, a record set by Irishman Jimmy Dunne twenty years earlier. Although missing two games through injury during the span, Mortensen scored in 15 consecutive matches before a blank, but scored again for 16 goals in 17 matches. He scored 25 goals in 22 games from December as he finished that season with 30 league goals. He was top scorer every season during his time at the club. He started his tenth season with the club before being transferred to second division Hull City. After joining Southport, Mortensen announced his retirement from playing on 24 April 1958, at the age of 37. "I have been having trouble with my knee and have had several injections," he said, after deciding against renewing his contract. "Making the decision was not easy." Despite the announcement, he went on to play for non-League clubs Bath City and Lancaster City.

International career
Mortensen won his first international cap for England in a friendly international against Portugal on 25th May 1947. He scored four goals as England romped to a 10-0 victory. His first competitive match came in October, a British home championship match against Wales at Ninian Park. He was on target as England won 3-0. In a friendly the following month against Sweden he hit a hat-trick in a 4-2 win at Highbury. He would score another hat-trick, this time in a 1948 British home championship match as England beat Ireland 6-2 at Windsor Park, Belfast.

On June 25, 1950, Mortensen scored England’s first goal at a World Cup tournament, as England beat Chile 2-0 at the Maracana Stadium in Brazil.

Stan Mortensen won his last international cap for England against Hungary on 25th November, 1953. The infamous Match of the Century saw England lose their long unbeaten home record against foreign opposition. England lost the game 6-3, with Mortensen on target before half time after England went 4-1 down.

Mortensen scored 23 goals in 25 appearances, but a series of knee injuries restricted his appearances. Mortensen was also eligible to play for Norway, as his grandfather Hans, was born in Norway before moving to South Shields.

Post-retirement
After retiring for good, Mortensen returned to Blackpool as manager between 1967 and 1969, when he was sacked. He also auctioned his football medals in order to help Blackpool through a tough spell.

On 20 October 1983, at the Blackpool supporters' annual general meeting, Mortensen was voted vice-president.

On 18 November 1989, Mortensen led the Blackpool team out onto the Bloomfield Road pitch for their FA Cup first-round tie with Bolton Wanderers. Former Bolton Wanderers forward Nat Lofthouse, who faced Mortensen and Blackpool in the 1953 FA Cup Final, led the visitors out.

Twelve days later, on 30 November, a tribute dinner for Mortensen was held at Blackpool's Savoy Hotel. Attended by many former Blackpool players, the event was arranged to honour Mortys fifty years of service to both Blackpool Football Club and the town.

Death and legacy

Mortensen died four days before his 70th birthday, on 22 May 1991, the day Blackpool reached Wembley for the first time since 1953. They had beaten Scunthorpe United 3–2 on aggregate to reach the Fourth Division play-off final. A minute's silence was held before the final against Torquay United.

On his death, it was said, "They'll probably call it the Matthews funeral," in reference to Mortensen's overshadowing by Stanley Matthews after the 1953 FA Cup Final. His funeral was held at St John's parish church, Blackpool, and he was cremated at Carleton Crematorium in Carleton, Lancashire.

The month of May became associated with much of his life. During May, he was born, signed professionally, made his England debut, won the FA Cup, and died.

Mortensen is mentioned with admiration in the song "1966 and All That" on the 1986 vinyl EP The Trumpton Riots (incorporated into the 2003 CD re-release of the 1985 album Back in the DHSS) by the indie band Half Man Half Biscuit, who call him "The Tangerine Wizard" and "The Jesus Christ of Bloomfield Road".

In 2003, Mortensen was posthumously inducted into the English Football Hall of Fame in recognition of his talent and achievements.

On 23 August 2005, a statue of Mortensen was unveiled by his widow, Jean, and former Blackpool teammate Jimmy Armfield in front of Bloomfield Road's new North Stand, which now bears his name. "Of all the honours that Stan won in football, he would think this was top of the league. He was so very proud of playing for Blackpool and loved everything about the town. Nothing was ever too much trouble for him when the club or town came knocking. For him to be remembered in a statue, he would think it was the creme de la creme. A massive thank-you has to go to the generous people of Blackpool, who have dug deep to raise money for this. Stan would have been really proud." Jean Mortensen died in July 2009 at the age of 88.

In the 2005 film The Game of Their Lives he is portrayed by Gavin Rossdale of Bush fame. The BBC notes that some viewers may be amused by the fact that "Mortensen – a working class Geordie – [is] portrayed [in the film] as [a] sneering toff," suggesting that the American film stereotyped English players in a "wooden and clichéd" manner.

Blackpool F.C. Hall of Fame
Mortensen was inducted into the Hall of Fame at Bloomfield Road, when it was officially opened by former Blackpool player Jimmy Armfield in April 2006. Organised by the Blackpool Supporters Association, Blackpool fans around the world voted on their all-time heroes. Five players from each decade are inducted; Mortensen is in the 1950s.

Career statistics

Club

International

Scores and results list England's goal tally first, score column indicates score after each Mortensen goal.
Stats taken from England national football team results (1930–59).

Managerial statistics

Honours
Blackpool
FA Cup: 1952–53; runner-up: 1947–48, 1950–51

Footnotes

See also 
 List of English football first tier top scorers
 List of footballers in England by number of league goals
 List of men's footballers with 500 or more goals

References

Further reading

External links
Profile at Blackpool F.C.'s official website
Playing profile at Soccerbase
Managerial profile at Soccerbase
England profile at the FA's official website
Appearances and goals record for England
Mortensen in the Blackpool Supporters Association Hall of Fame

1921 births
1991 deaths
English footballers
Royal Air Force personnel of World War II
Wales wartime international footballers
England international footballers
England wartime international footballers
1950 FIFA World Cup players
Arsenal F.C. wartime guest players
Blackpool F.C. players
Hull City A.F.C. players
Southport F.C. players
Bath City F.C. players
Lancaster City F.C. players
Huddersfield Town A.F.C. wartime guest players
Aberdeen F.C. wartime guest players
English Football League players
First Division/Premier League top scorers
English football managers
Blackpool F.C. managers
Footballers from South Shields
English Football Hall of Fame inductees
English people of Norwegian descent
Watford F.C. wartime guest players
English Football League representative players
Association football forwards
Royal Air Force airmen
FA Cup Final players